The Court of St James's is the royal court for the Sovereign of the United Kingdom. All ambassadors to the United Kingdom are formally received by the court. All ambassadors from the United Kingdom are formally accredited from the court as they are representatives of the Crown.

The Marshal of the Diplomatic Corps (before 1920, Master of the Ceremonies), who acts as the link between the British monarch and foreign diplomatic missions, is permanently based at St James's Palace. In 1886, there were only six ambassadors in London, with 37 other countries represented by ministers. By 2015, this had increased to 175 foreign missions accredited to the Court of St James's: 47 high commissions from Commonwealth countries and 128 embassies from non-Commonwealth countries.

Official meetings and receptions associated with the court, such as Privy Council meetings or the annual Diplomatic Reception attended by 1,500 guests, are held wherever the monarch is in residence—usually Buckingham Palace.

Name
The Court of St James's is named after St James's Palace, hence the possessive s at the end of the name. This is because St James's Palace is the most senior royal palace and has remained the official residence of the British monarchy despite the nearby Buckingham Palace having been the main London residence of all the UK's sovereigns since the accession of Queen Victoria in 1837. Sometimes the court's name is spoken incorrectly as the Court of St James, that is, incorrect without a separate "iz" pronunciation for the possessive "s" suffix.

See also
 Diplomatic rank
 His Majesty's Diplomatic Service
 List of diplomatic missions in the United Kingdom
 List of diplomatic missions of the United Kingdom

References

British monarchy
Diplomacy
Diplomatic services
Foreign relations of the United Kingdom
Foreign relations of Great Britain
Foreign relations of England
British royal court